This is a list of the National Register of Historic Places listings in Jefferson County, Wisconsin. It is intended to provide a comprehensive listing of entries in the National Register of Historic Places that are located in Jefferson County, Wisconsin.  The locations of National Register properties for which the latitude and longitude coordinates are included below may be seen in a map.

There are 59 properties and districts listed on the National Register in the county.

Current listings

South Main Street Residential Historic District,
226-275 South Main St., 307-354 South Main St.,
Lake Mills, RS100004026,
LISTED, 4/20/2020

|}

See also 

 List of National Historic Landmarks in Wisconsin
 National Register of Historic Places listings in Wisconsin
 Listings in neighboring counties: Dane, Dodge, Rock, Walworth, Waukesha

References 

 
Jefferson